The 1897 Missouri Tigers football team was an American football team that represented the University of Missouri as an independent during the 1897 college football season. In its first season under head coach Charles Young, the team compiled an 5–6 record.

Schedule

References

Missouri
Missouri Tigers football seasons
Missouri Tigers football